Masisi Territory is a territory which is located within the North Kivu Province of the Democratic Republic of the Congo. Its political headquarters are located in the town of Masisi.

Overview

Masisi territory has an area of 4734 km. Masisi Territory is administratively subdivided into four sectors: Bahunde, Bashali, Katoyi, and Osso. Some of the local languages spoken are French, Swahili, Kinyarwanda, and Hunde. Masisi is bordered by Walikale Territory on the west and north, Rutshuru Territory to the northeast, Nyiragongo Territory and Goma to the east, and South Kivu to the south.

The following lists the organizational subunits of the territory, as of 1977.

 Masisi Territory
Bahunde Chiefdom
Muvunyi-Karuba
Muvunyi-Kibabi
Muvunyi-Matanda
Muvunyi-Shanga
Ufamando I
Bashali Chiefdom
Bashali Mokoto
Bashali Kaembe
Katoyi Sector
Kambuli
Lwindi
Nyalipe
Nyamaboko II
Ufamando II
Osso Sector
Bapfuna
Banyungu
Bigiri
Bugabo
Nyamaboko I

Locations

The administrative center of the territory is the town of Masisi, which contains Masisi Hospital, run by aid agency Médecins Sans Frontières, treats civilians and fighters from all sides of the conflict. The town is inaccessible much of the time, due to fighting.

The town of Sake in Masisi, located at a crossroads, is the main headquarters of the United Nations Force Intervention Brigade (part of MONUSCO).

Other settlements in Masisi include Karuba and Burungu, as well as the coltan mining center of Rubaya. Near the town of Mweso there is a tea processing plant as part of a 450 hectare tea plantation known as JTN.

The eastern portion of the territory is part of Virunga National Park, and contains the active volcano Nyamuragira and its satellite Rumoka.

History

The area was traditionally inhabited mostly by the Hunde people, as well as some Twa people. With support from the Belgians, one of the small local chiefs, Mwami André Kalinda, expanded his chiefdom, the Grande Chefferie des Bahunde to encompass of all of Masisi by 1935.

During the colonial period in the 1940s and 1950s, the Belgian administration had a "dual colonization" policy of bringing in many immigrant white people and Banyarwanda (Hutus and Tutsis) to settle in the area, based on the promise of land. The colonial parastatal  gave out long term leases to the settlers in Bashali Chiefdom, to focus on tea and pyrethrum cash crops.

During the Congo crisis in the early 1960s, voting rights were first granted to the Rwandan immigrants. Their immediate electoral success prompted a backlash from the Hunde population, who took control of local politics under the slogan udongo ya baba (father's land). Increasing violence between the Hunde administration and the immigrant population spiraled into the Kanyarwanda War. The violence prompted most of the white settlers to leave, with all the remaining whites gone after the implementation of the Zaïranization policy in the early 1970s.

Historical events such as the 1977 eruption of Mount Nyiragongo prompted additional immigration to the area. The Banyarwanda acquired the overwhelming majority of the ex-colonial plantations, such as the case of Barthélémy Bisengimana, who served as chief of staff for DRC president Mobutu as well as taking over the large Osso concession in Masisi.

Since at least the 1970s, the territory has been divided into the four modern collectives: Bahunde chiefdom and Bashali chiefdom are run by the traditional ethnic Hunde chiefs, and Katoyi and Osso are organized as sectors.

Conflict

Masisi Territory has constantly been subjected to the conflict between the Congolese army and militias, which has plagued the eastern Congo since the ending of the Second Congo War. militias originating from the Rwandan genocide and the Congolese civil war, and Ugandan rebel groups, are involved in these episodes of conflict, which also relates to Rwandan border security and the control of eastern Congo's minerals by rebel groups and business interests.  Armed groups have systematically targeted the civilian population.

Another active group is the Alliance of Patriots for a Free and Sovereign Congo (APCLS), a majority Hunde Mai-Mai.

In July 2014, an offensive in the Masisi and Walikale Territories by the Congolese army and UN forces liberated 20 rebel controlled towns, freeing the local residents.

As of 2023, the majority Tutsi March 23 Movement has taken control of portions of the territory during its recent offensive. The Nyatura and APCLS militias are currently in a coalition to resist the M23.

References

Territories of North Kivu Province